Shawnelle Scott (born June 16, 1972) is an American retired professional basketball player. A 6'10" center out of St. John's University, he was selected by the Portland Trail Blazers with the 43rd overall pick (second round) of the 1994 NBA draft.  His first two years of professional basketball were in the Continental Basketball Association for the Oklahoma City Cavalry and the Connecticut Pride.  He then played in four NBA seasons for three teams: Cleveland Cavaliers (1996-97 and 1997-98), San Antonio Spurs (2000-01), and Denver Nuggets (2001-02). He currently works as a high school basketball coach and physics teacher at Millennium Brooklyn High School in New York City.

References

External links

USBasket profile

1972 births
Living people
African-American basketball players
American expatriate basketball people in China
American expatriate basketball people in Greece
American expatriate basketball people in Italy
American men's basketball players
Basketball players from New York City
Centers (basketball)
Cleveland Cavaliers players
Connecticut Pride players
Denver Nuggets players
Greek Basket League players
Jilin Northeast Tigers players
Pallacanestro Varese players
Olympia Larissa B.C. players
Oklahoma City Cavalry players
Portland Trail Blazers draft picks
San Antonio Spurs players
St. John's Red Storm men's basketball players
Teramo Basket players
United States Basketball League players
21st-century African-American sportspeople
20th-century African-American sportspeople